Terrence O'Connor is a judge currently serving on the Tax Court of Canada.

References

Judges of the Federal Court of Canada
Year of birth missing (living people)
Living people
Place of birth missing (living people)